The following lists notable events that happened during 2017 in Pakistan.

Incumbents

Federal government
 Nawaz Sharif, Prime Minister, 5 June 2013-28 July 2017
 Shahid Khaqan Abbasi, Prime Minister, 1 August 2017 - incumbent
 Mamnoon Hussain, President, 9 September 2013-9 September 2018
 Mian Saqib Nisar, Chief Justice, 31 December 2016-present

Governors
 Governor of Balochistan – Muhammad Khan Achakzai 
 Governor of Gilgit-Baltistan – Mir Ghazanfar Ali Khan 
 Governor of Khyber Pakhtunkhwa – Iqbal Zafar Jhagra 
 Governor of Punjab – Malik Muhammad Rafique Rajwana 
 Governor of Sindh – Saeeduzzaman Siddiqui (until 8 February); Mohammad Zubair (starting 8 February)

Events

January
 January 21 - A bombing at a vegetable market in Parachinar, Pakistan led to the death of 25 people.

February
 February 9 – The second season of the Pakistan Super League began.
 February 16 – A suicide bombing at the Shrine of Lal Shahbaz Qalander in Sehwan, Pakistan resulted in the deaths of over 90 people.
 February 19 - Pakistan at the 2017 Asian Winter Games

March
 March 5 – The second season of the Pakistan Super League ended.
 March 14 – Pakistan's sixth census  began.

April 
 April 19 – 16th Lux Style Awards's ceremony was held in Karachi and was hosted by Atif Aslam.

June
 June 1 - 18 – Pakistan won the 2017 ICC Champions Trophy 2017 defeating India.
 June 23 - A series of bombings in Quetta and Parachinar led to the death of over 90 people.

July
 July 28 – A unanimous verdict by the Supreme Court of Pakistan disqualified Prime Minister Nawaz Sharif from office, over the controversy of him and some of his family members names being in the Panama Papers, which led to his resignation.

August
 August 1 - Shahid Khaqan Abbasi was sworn in as Prime Minister, succeeding Nawaz Sharif. 
 August 31 - The investigation into the assassination of former Prime Minister Benazir Bhutto was completed.

September
 September 17 - Pakistan at the 2017 Asian Indoor and Martial Arts Games

November
 November 5 - 27 Tehreek-e-Labaik, an Islamist party led by Khadim Hussain Rizvi, staged protests  in the federal capital Islamabad over minor changes in the oath required for parliamentarians over belief in the finality of the prophethood of Muhammad, and demanded the resignation of the Federal Minister of Law and Justice  Zahid Hamid whom they held responsible for it. Hamid eventually resigned on November 27.
 November 24 - a suicide bomber struck the vehicle of AIG Ashraf Noor in Hayatabad, Peshawar.

December
 December 17 - An attack by two suicide bombers on a church in the city of Quetta left nine people dead and fifty-seven injured.

General
 Half of the Pakistani homes are not connected to the electr[...] network.

Public holidays

See also

 Timeline of Pakistani history

References

 
Pakistan
Years of the 21st century in Pakistan
2010s in Pakistan
Pakistan